Incurvaria is a genus of moths of the family Incurvariidae.

Selected species
Incurvaria alniella (Issiki, 1957)
Incurvaria circulella (Zetterstedt, 1839)
Incurvaria evocata (Meyrick, 1924)
Incurvaria koerneriella (Zeller, 1839)
Incurvaria masculella (Denis & Schiffermuller, 1775)
Incurvaria oehlmanniella (Hubner, 1796)
Incurvaria pectinea Haworth, 1828
Incurvaria pirinella (Junnilainen, Kaitila & Mutanen, 2020)
Incurvaria ploessli Huemer, 1993
Incurvaria praelatella (Denis & Schiffermuller, 1775)
Incurvaria takeuchii Issiki, 1957
Incurvaria triglavensis Hauder, 1912
Incurvaria vetulella (Zetterstedt, 1839)

References
Incurvaria at funet

Incurvariidae
Adeloidea genera